Ulbrich is a surname of German origin. Notable people with this surname include:

Carla Ulbrich, American singer-songwriter and guitarist
Jeff Ulbrich (born 1977), former American football linebacker
Josef Ulbrich (1843–1910), Austro-Hungarian lawyer and university teacher
Oskar Eberhard Ulbrich (1879–1952), German botanist and mycologist
Peter Ulbrich (born 1955), German fencer
Walter Ulbrich (1910–1991), German film producer
Wilhelm Ulbrich (1846–1922), German journalist and poet

German-language surnames
Surnames from given names